Thomas Francis Xavier Smith (July 5, 1928 – May 31, 1996) was a reformist politician and author. He served as mayor of Jersey City, New Jersey, from 1977 to 1981.

Career
Smith was affectionately known as "The Mouth That Roared" due to his outspoken criticism of the political cronyism and corruption for which Hudson County had long been infamous. Smith left the mayor's office for a bid for Governor of New Jersey in 1981, in which he finished sixth in a field of 13 candidates vying for the Democratic nomination, and was unsuccessful in a subsequent bid for the mayoralty of Jersey City in 1989.

Smith wrote Powerticians, a history of Jersey City politics and the attempts to remove the city from the grip of the political machine created by Frank Hague, Hudson County political boss and sometimes mayor of Jersey City. The book was published by Lyle Stuart, Inc., of Secaucus, New Jersey, in 1982..

Personal life
Smith attended St. Peter's Preparatory School in Jersey City. He was a star basketball player at Saint Peter's College, New Jersey, where he earned an undergraduate degree with a major in English, and received a master's degree from Fordham University in educational psychology. He was director of placement at St. Peter's and a vice president of Hudson County Community College.  Smith played for the New York Knicks briefly in 1951.

Smith died of cancer in 1996, and is buried in Holy Name Cemetery, Jersey City.

See also
List of mayors of Jersey City, New Jersey

References

Bibliography

External links

1928 births
1996 deaths
Basketball players from Jersey City, New Jersey
New York Knicks draft picks
Sportspeople from Jersey City, New Jersey
Saint Peter's Peacocks men's basketball players
American athlete-politicians
Deaths from cancer in New Jersey
New Jersey Democrats
Writers from Jersey City, New Jersey
Burials at Holy Name Cemetery (Jersey City, New Jersey)
20th-century American politicians
American men's basketball players